Cédric Boussoughou Mabikou (born 20 July 1991 in Moanda) is Gabonese player who plays for AS Mangasport. He captained the Gabon under-23 team to qualification for the 2012 Olympics and was in the squad for the senior team at 2012 Africa Cup of Nations.

In July 2013, he left Gabon to play for Tunisian side Olympique Béja.

References 

1991 births
Living people
Gabonese footballers
Gabon international footballers
Gabonese expatriate footballers
Expatriate footballers in Tunisia
Gabonese expatriate sportspeople in Tunisia
2012 Africa Cup of Nations players
Olympic footballers of Gabon
Footballers at the 2012 Summer Olympics
Association football midfielders
People from Moanda
Olympique Béja players
21st-century Gabonese people
Cameroonian expatriate sportspeople in South Africa
2011 African Nations Championship players